Fieroes Zeroual (born 29 November 1972) is a Dutch businesswoman and former politician who served as an MP in the House of Representatives for the Pim Fortuyn List (LPF) from 2002 to 2003.

Biography 
Zeroual was born in Helmond, North Brabant in 1972 to a family of Moroccan descent. She ran a nail studio in Helmond and a jewelry business in Tilburg. Zeroual was also involved in setting up a local newspaper in Tilburg.

She first became involved in politics in 2002 when she joined the Pim Fortuyn List and was elected to the House of Representatives during the election held that year. In parliament she focused on matters related to asylum and integration. In parliament she stood out because of her open-minded nature, but also short action. Her maiden speech covered only a few lines. She left politics in 2003 and moved to Hong Kong for a period before relocating to the United States to run a new business focusing on health and nutrition.

References 

Living people
Members of the House of Representatives (Netherlands)
Pim Fortuyn List politicians
Dutch people of Moroccan descent
1972 births
People from Helmond
21st-century Dutch politicians
21st-century Dutch women politicians
Dutch emigrants to the United States